Heraclitus and Democritus is a painting by the Flemish artist Peter Paul Rubens in 1603 in Valladolid during Rubens' stay in Spain for the Duke of Lerma . It is now held in the National Sculpture Museum in Valladolid. It shows the ancient Greek philosophers Heraclitus and Democritus.

External links
 http://cvc.cervantes.es/el_rinconete/anteriores/junio_00/13062000_02.htm

1603 paintings
Paintings by Peter Paul Rubens
Paintings in Spain
Heraclitus